SHN, or Shn, may refer to:

 School health and nutrition services
 Servicio de Hidrografia Naval, the Argentine Naval Hydrographic Service
 SHN (theatres), a theatrical production company, now known as BroadwaySF, in San Francisco, US
 SHN, the file name extension for the Shorten file format
 SHN, the IATA code for Sanderson Field in the state of Washington, US
 SHN, the ISO 3166-1 alpha-3 code for Saint Helena, Ascension and Tristan da Cunha
 shn, the ISO 639-3 code for the Shan language spoken in Shan State, Myanmar
 SHN, the National Rail code for Shanklin railway station on the Isle of Wight, UK

See also